In mathematics, dependent random choice is a probabilistic technique that shows how to find a large set of vertices in a dense graph such that every small subset of vertices has many common neighbors. It is a useful tool to embed a graph into another graph with many edges. Thus it has its application in extremal graph theory, additive combinatorics and Ramsey theory.

Statement of theorem
Let ,  and suppose:

Proof
The basic idea is to choose the set of vertices randomly. However, instead of choosing each vertex uniformly at random, the procedure randomly chooses a list of  vertices first and then chooses common neighbors as the set of vertices. The hope is that in this way, the chosen set would be more likely to have more common neighbors.

Therefore by linearity of expectation, To eliminate bad subsets, we the procedure is to exclude one element in each bad subset. The number of remaining elements is at least , whose expected value is at least  Consequently, there exists a  such that there are at least  elements in  remaining after getting rid of all bad -element subsets. The set  of the remaining  elements expresses the desired properties.

Applications

Turán numbers of a bipartite graph
DRC can help find the Turán number.

and so the assumption of dependent random choice holds. Hence, for each graph  with at least  edges, there exists a vertex subset  of size  satisfying that every -subset of  has at least  common neighbors. Thus  can be embedded into one of the common neighbors while avoiding collisions.

This can be generalized to degenerate graphs using the variation of dependent random choice.

Embedding a 1-subdivision of a complete graph
DRC can be applied directly to show that if  is a graph on  vertices and  edges, then  contains a 1-subdivision of a complete graph with  vertices. This can be shown in a similar way to the above proof of the bound on Turán number  of a bipartite graph.

Indeed, if we set , we have (since )and so the DRC assumption holds. Since a 1-subdivision of the complete graph on  vertices is a bipartite graph with parts of size  and  where every vertex in the second part has degree two, the embedding argument in the proof of the bound on Turán number of a bipartite graph produces the desired result.

Variation  

Suppose that the following constraints hold:

Extremal number of a degenerate bipartite graph
Using this stronger statement, one can upper bound the extremal number of -degenerate bipartite graph: for each -degenerate bipartite graph  with at most  vertices, the extremal number  ist at most

Ramsey number of a degenerate bipartite graph
This statement can be also applied to obtain an upper bound of the Ramsey number of a degenerate bipartite graphs. If  is a fixed integer, then for every bipartite -degenerate bipartite graph  on  vertices, the Ramsey number  is of the order

References

Further reading 
Dependent Random Choice - MIT Math

Extremal graph theory
Probabilistic arguments